A gown, from the Saxon word, gunna, is a usually loose outer garment from knee-to-full-length worn by men and women in Europe from the Early Middle Ages to the 17th century, and continuing today in certain professions; later, the term gown was applied to any full-length woman's garment consisting of a bodice and an attached skirt. A long, loosely fitted gown called a Banyan was worn by men in the 18th century as an informal coat.

The gowns worn today by academics, judges, and some clergy derive directly from the everyday garments worn by their medieval predecessors, formalized into a uniform in the course of the 16th and 17th centuries.

Terminology 

A modern-day gown refers to several types of garments. It can refer to a woman's dress, especially a formal or fancy dress. It may also refer to a nightgown or a dressing gown. In academia, and other traditional areas such as the legal world, gowns are also worn on various formal or ceremonial occasions.

History 

The gunna was worn by Anglo-Saxon women and consisted of a long, loose outer garment. The gunna was also called a cote, surcoat, or robe.

Gowns were worn by students attending early European universities in the 12th and 13th centuries. The gowns, and the hoods that accompanied them, would indicate their status. From the 14th to the 17th centuries, the term "gown" was used to describe any long, loose, robe-like garment worn by both men and women.

In the 1500s in Italy, a gown was known as a camora or by regional names in various locations. The look of the camora changed over time, starting out with a high waist and low neckline at the beginning of the century and gradually becoming low-waisted and high-necked by the end. Italian women also wore an overgown called a vestito or a roba. In turn, these might be covered by a robone which was lined with fabrics or furs for warmth.

By the late 16th century, gowns were no longer in style in Italy except where they were worn to denote a professional station, such as a banker or priest.

In the 17th century, women's gowns in the  American colonies included trimming around the neck and down the bodice, or in the case of an open gown, down front edges from hem to neck. Gowns may also have borders of silk, ribbons and other decorations. Women in the American colonies wore short gowns as working clothing and informal clothing during the 18th century. The gowns were t-shaped and had side godets for additional volume.

See also 

 Banyan (clothing)
 Grand boubou, a gown of West Africa 
 Clothing terminology 
 Dress
 Frock
 List of individual dresses
 Robe
 Skirt
 1550–1600 in fashion
 1600–1650 in fashion

Types of gowns

Academic dress (cap and gown)
Ball gown
Bedgown
Bouffant gown
Coronation gown
Evening gown
Hospital gown
Nightgown
Tea gown
Wedding gown
Sheer fabric
Décolletage

References 

Bibliography
Arnold, Janet: Patterns of Fashion 2: Englishwomen's Dresses and Their Construction c.1860–1940, Wace 1966, Macmillan 1972. Revised metric edition, Drama Books 1977.  
Ashelford, Jane: The Art of Dress: Clothing and Society 1500–1914, Abrams, 1996.  
Black, J. Anderson and Madge Garland: A History of Fashion, Morrow, 1975. 

  Kemp, Roger L.  "Town and Gown Relations: A Handbook of Best Practices," McFarland and Company, Inc., Publishers, Jefferson, North Carolina, USA, and London, England, UK, (2013). .
  
  

Medieval European costume
12th-century fashion
13th-century fashion
14th-century fashion
15th-century fashion
16th-century fashion
17th-century fashion
18th-century fashion
19th-century fashion
20th-century fashion
21st-century fashion
Academic dress
Dresses
 
History of fashion
History of clothing (Western fashion)
Judicial clothing
Women's clothing